State Route 246 (SR 246) is a state highway in the U.S. state of California that runs from Lompoc east to Solvang and Santa Ynez, cutting through the Santa Ynez Valley and the Santa Barbara Wine Country. Its western terminus is at the western city limits of Lompoc, and its eastern terminus is at State Route 154 near Santa Ynez.

Route description

Most of the road is two lanes wide, with the exception of the route through the cities of Lompoc and Buellton. This is the primary route from U.S. Route 101 to Solvang. It follows the Santa Ynez River for most of its length. The portion of the route through Solvang is called Mission Drive, while through Lompoc—including the portion where it is co-signed with State Route 1—it is called Ocean Avenue.

SR 246 begins at the western city limits of Lompoc, where it runs along Ocean Avenue to H Street, joining SR 1. The SR 246/SR 1 concurrency continues east along Ocean Avenue to the eastern edge of the city. SR 246 then splits from SR 1 and heads northeast out of Lompoc along a relatively flat two-lane road until reaching Buellton, where it widens upon its intersection with US 101. It narrows once again to two lanes through Solvang and Santa Ynez before reaching its eastern terminus at the junction with State Route 154.

SR 246 passes two of Santa Barbara County's Spanish-era missions, La Purísima Concepción near Lompoc, and Santa Inés in Solvang.

Part of SR 246 in Lompoc is in the National Highway System, a network of highways that are considered essential to the country's economy, defense, and mobility by the Federal Highway Administration.

History
In 1933, this was designated as a state highway, and was numbered as Route 149 in 1935. In 1963, it was part of State Route 154. In the 1964 state highway renumbering, it was renumbered to SR 246. SR 246 used to run all the way west to Surf, but this segment along Ocean Avenue to the western city limits of Lompoc was relinquished to local control in 1984.

Major intersections

See also

References

External links

California @ AARoads.com - State Route 246
Caltrans: Route 246 highway conditions
California Highways: SR 246

246
State Route 246
Lompoc, California
Solvang, California